Gerhard Karner (born 13 November 1967 in Melk) is an Austrian politician currently serving as minister of the interior. From 2003, Karner was a member of the Lower Austrian state legislature. From 2003 to 2015, he was managing director of the People's Party of Lower Austria (VPNÖ). Following the 2015 mayoral election, he became mayor of Texingtal and retained this position until 2021.

Life
Gerhard Karner spent his childhood and youth in St. Gotthard (municipality of Texingtal) and graduated from Melk Abbey High School, later studying business administration at the Vienna University of Economics and Business. He then worked in the private sector as a press officer for the Lower Austrian People's Party (ÖVP). He later served as press spokesman for Interior Minister Ernst Strasser, and as a regional manager of the ÖVP Lower Austria.

Politics
Karner was politically active as a local councilor in Texingtal from 1995, and from April 24, 2003 also as an ÖVP member in the Lower Austrian state parliament. Karner was security spokesman for the ÖVP state parliament club. On October 22, 2015, he became second president of the state parliament. In the same year he was also mayor of Texingtal. On December 3, 2021, he was nominated as Minister of the Interior in the designated federal government of Nehammer and sworn in by the Federal President on December 6, 2021. he lay with his swearing in as Minister down all communal and national political offices.

His state parliament mandate went to Marlene Zeidler-Beck, as second state parliament president Karl Moser should succeed him.

On 8 December 2022 he was one of the architects of blocking Romania and Bulgaria access in Schengen area.

Criticism

Even before he became Minister of the Interior, he was criticized by left-wing historians as mayor. The Texingtal community, of which he was mayor, has been running the Dollfuss Museum in the original birthplace of Engelbert Dollfuss since 1998. In 2018 Karner wanted to deal with the "controversial person Dollfuss". However, Karner saw nothing worth questioning about the uncritical museum. Despite widespread criticism, Interior Minister Gerhard Karner planned on sticking to the plans of his predecessors, Wolfgang Peschorn and Karl Nehammer, and moving the Braunau district police command to Adolf Hitler's birthplace.

Anti-Semitism allegations
Shortly after he was sworn in as Minister of the Interior, accusations of anti-Semitism were raised against him in a press release from his time as state manager of the ÖVP Lower Austria. In this press release he accused the SPÖ of Lower Austria of working "with gentlemen from America and Israel against the country", with which Karner used anti-Semitic stereotypes for the Jewish Austrian students (JöH). For this reason, the JöH initiated an open letter in which they called for the office of Minister of the Interior to be filled. The signers of this letter include the writer Elfriede Jelinek, the author Doron Rabinovici and the former OGH President Irmgard Griss. Karner defended himself by saying that taking a stand against anti-Semitism was a "personal concern" to him and that during the election campaign "words and sentences were generally used that one would probably no longer use in the same way afterwards". He later publicly apologized for these claims.

Accusation of plagiarism regarding his thesis
On October 4, 2022, it became known that Stefan Weber, known as a “plagiarism hunter”, raised allegations regarding Karner’s diploma thesis , which is entitled “Decision-making or decision-making behavior in the choice of special business administration courses at the Vienna University of Economics and Business ”. According to Weber, he should copied from the work "Information and Purchase Decision" by Alfred Kuß and marked it as "not or completely insufficient". Also, according to Weber, the first thirty pages of the work should be an “ Amalgamfrom uncited or insufficiently cited foreign texts”. Karner himself denies the allegations: According to him, he wrote the entire work “according to good scientific practice and to the best of my knowledge and belief”, and he looks forward to an examination of any kind “with composure”.

Awards
2014: Great Silver Medal of Honor for Services to the Republic of Austria
2019: Golden Commander's Cross of Honor for Services to the State of Lower Austria

References

Interior ministers of Austria
20th-century Austrian politicians
21st-century Austrian politicians
Anti-Bulgarian sentiment
Anti-Romanian sentiment
Austrian eurosceptics
Spokespersons
Austrian People's Party politicians
Austrian conspiracy theorists
1967 births
Living people